Ganzorigiin Temüülen is a Mongolian politician and businessman currently serving as a member of the State Great Khural. He was elected in the 2016 Mongolian legislative election.  He represents the first constituency of Province of Arkhangai and is a member of the Mongolian People's Party.

Career 
He attended Dickinson College in Canberra, Australia before attending university.

He attended and received his education from American University in Washington, D.C., where he received a 4-year degree in international management and relations in 2003. In 2005, he earned a master's degree in International relations and management.

From 2006 to 2009, he served as head of the department of the Contracting Division at the government agency Mineral Resource Authority of Mongolia.  In 2008, he was formally appointed to Minister for Oil and Minerals while concurrently contracts chief.

In 2009, he left political office and job to become the deputy director for Erdenes MGL, a large state-owned enterprise that focused on mining around Ulaanbaatar. He left in 2014. In 2013, he left Erdenes MGL and joined the board of directors of the state owned enterprise Oyu Tolgoi LLC, a position he held until 2015.  In 2014, he was appointed to the government cabinet as the deputy Minister of Mines, alongside his job at Ovu Tolgoi. He held both positions until 2015.

In 2015, he was appointed president of the Mongolian youth federation Zorig Foundation, serving for the full year. In the same year, he was elected to the board of directors for the Mongolian People's Party for the entire year.  In 2016, he was elected as a member of the State Great Khural representing constituency #1 in Arkhangai Province, alongside Yondonperenlein Baatarbileg and Jamyangiin Mönkhbat. He received 9,817 votes with 57.75% of the vote.

See also 
 List of MPs elected in the 2016 Mongolian legislative election

References 

Living people
Mongolian People's Party politicians
American University alumni
Year of birth missing (living people)
Dickinson College alumni